McBrearty is a surname. Notable people with the surname include:

Don McBrearty, Canadian film director
Felix McBrearty, Northern Irish darts player
Frank McBrearty Snr, Irish businessman
Frank McBrearty Jnr, Irish politician
Patrick McBrearty (born 1993), Irish Gaelic footballer
Stephen McBrearty, Irish Gaelic footballer and younger brother of Patrick